The 1956 Kent State Golden Flashes football team was an American football team that represented Kent State University in the Mid-American Conference (MAC) during the 1956 NCAA University Division football season. In their 11th season under head coach Trevor J. Rees, the Golden Flashes compiled a 7–2 record (4–2 against MAC opponents), finished in third place in the MAC, and outscored all opponents by a combined total of 208 to 76.

The team's statistical leaders included Ron Fowler with 522 rushing yards, Ken Horton with 703 passing yards, and Dick Mihalus with 238 receiving yards.  End Gino Gioia and fullback Luke Owens were selected as first-team All-MAC players.

Schedule

References

Kent State
Kent State Golden Flashes football seasons
Kent State Golden Flashes football